Maurice Harington Kaufmann (29 June 1927 – 21 September 1997) was a British actor of stage, film and television, who specialised in whodunits and horror films, from 1954 to 1981, when he retired.

Personal life
He was married to Honor Blackman from 1961 to 1975; they appeared together in the film, Fright (1971). They adopted two children, daughter Lottie and son Barnaby, before divorcing in 1975.

Death
Maurice Kaufmann died in 1997 in London from cancer, aged 70. He was nursed, on his deathbed, by his ex-wife, Honor Blackman.

Selected filmography

 Appointment in London (1953) as Raf Officer (uncredited)
 The Angel Who Pawned Her Harp (1954) as Reg
 Beau Brummell (1954) as Lord Alvanley (uncredited)
 To Dorothy a Son (1954) as Elmer the Pianist
 Companions in Crime (1954) as Arnold Kendall
 Three Cases of Murder (1955) as Pemberton (segment "You Killed Elizabeth")
 The Love Match (1955) as Harry Longworth
 The Quatermass Xperiment (1955) as Marsh (uncredited)
 Secret Venture (1955) as Dan Flemying
 An Alligator Named Daisy (1955) as Ed (uncredited)
 Handcuffs, London (1955) as Jerry Strong
 Women Without Men (1956) as Daniels
 Blonde Bait (1956) as Daniels (uncredited)
 It's a Wonderful World (1956) as Paul Taylor
 Find the Lady (1956) as Nicky
 The Girl in the Picture (1957) as Rod Molloy
 The Man Without a Body (1957) as Chauffeur
 Fire Down Below (1957) as 3rd U.S. Sailor
 Date with Disaster (1957) as Don Redman
 Campbell's Kingdom (1957) as Man at Golden Calf 
 The Big Money (1958) as Harry's Friend (uncredited)
 Behemoth, the Sea Monster (1959) as Mini Submarine Officer
 Life in Emergency Ward 10 (1959) as Anaesthetist
 Top Floor Girl (1959) as Peter Farnite
 The Crowning Touch (1959) as David
 Gorgo (1961) as Radio Reporter
 House of Mystery (1961) as Henry Trevor
 Tarnished Heroes (1961) as Tom Mason
 Play It Cool (1962) as Larry Granger
 On the Beat (1962) as Vince
 We Shall See (1964) as Evan Collins
 A Shot in the Dark (1964) as Pierre
 Fanatic (1965) as Alan Glentower
 Circus of Fear (1966) as Mario
 Cry Wolf (1969) as Jim Walker
 Man of Violence (1971) as Charles Grayson
 The Abominable Dr. Phibes (1971) as Dr. Whitcombe
 Bloomfield (1971) as Yasha
 Fright (1971) as Inspector
 The Vault of Horror (1973) as Bob Dickson (segment 5 "Drawn and Quartered")
 The Strange Case of the End of Civilization as We Know It (1977) as Steve McGarrett

Death reference per General Register Office (GRO) of England and Wales
 Registration District: Fulham 
 County: London. 
 Year of Registration: 1997. 
 Month of Registration: September  
 Date of Birth: 29 June 1927 
 District No: 2281
 Reg No: 85A
 Ent No: 052

References

External links

1927 births
1997 deaths
English male film actors
English male stage actors
English male television actors
Male actors from London
People from Gorleston-on-Sea
Deaths from cancer in England
20th-century English male actors